Andrew Mittendorf is an American football (soccer) player played professionally in the United States and Sweden.

Youth
Mittendorf attended Lehigh University, playing on the men' soccer team from 1995 to 1998.  He began his collegiate career as a defender and ended it as a high scoring forward.  He was the 1997 Patriot League Player of the Year.  His senior season, he led the NCAA in goals per game.  In 1999, he was named to the Patriot League Men's Soccer All-Decade team.

Professional
In 1999, the Colorado Rapids selected Mittendorf in the first round (eighth overall) of the 1999 MLS College Draft.  The Lehigh Valley Steam also selected him in the USL A-League draft.  Mittendorf signed with the Rapids who released him on March 29, 1999, during a pre-season roster reduction.  He then joined the Hershey Wildcats of the A-League.  In 2000, he played for the Long Island Rough Riders.  In 2001, he played for Värtans IK in Sweden.  In 2002, he returned to the Rough Riders and retired at the end of the season.

In 2002, Mittendorf co-founded Coastal Soccer which he sold in 2006.

References

External links
 Where are they now? - Andrew Mittendorf '99

1977 births
Living people
American soccer players
American expatriate soccer players
Hershey Wildcats players
Lehigh Mountain Hawks men's soccer players
Long Island Rough Riders players
A-League (1995–2004) players
USL Second Division players
Värtans IK players
Expatriate footballers in Sweden
Soccer players from New York (state)
Colorado Rapids draft picks
Association football forwards